Osvaldo "Ozzie" Cisneros (born March 13, 2004) is an American professional soccer player who plays as an attacking midfielder for Major League Soccer club Sporting Kansas City.

Club career
Born in Omaha, Nebraska, Cisneros began playing soccer with his family as a toddler and attending games at Omaha's Latino League, where his father played, at age five. After playing for a local club which disbanded, Cisneros began playing with Los Guerreritos, a club founded by his father which played in the South Omaha league. He then joined Leones Negros, soon renamed Omaha Nitro, playing in various tournaments around Nebraska.

Sporting Kansas City
In 2016, Cisneros began playing in the youth academy of Sporting Kansas City, rising up the ranks before signing a professional homegrown player deal with the first team on January 20, 2021. On May 1, 2021, Cisneros made his professional debut for Sporting Kansas City II, the club's reserve side in the USL Championship, against FC Tulsa, starting in the 0–2 defeat. Cisneros played for the first team in a Leagues Cup game against Liga MX club León.

International career
Born in the United States to Mexican parents, Cisneros holds a U.S. and Mexican citizenship, which makes him eligible to represent either the United States or Mexico. Cisneros represented the United States at the under-15 level.

Career statistics

Club

References

External links
 Profile at Sporting Kansas City

2004 births
Living people
Sportspeople from Nebraska
American soccer players
Association football midfielders
Sporting Kansas City players
Sporting Kansas City II players
USL Championship players
Soccer players from Nebraska
United States men's youth international soccer players
MLS Next Pro players